Richard E. Handlen (March 25, 1897 - June 2, 1963) was an American Thoroughbred horse racing trainer whom the March 15, 1937 edition of the Los Angeles Times called "one of the best trainers in America"

Racing career
Early in his career, Richard Handlen worked for U.S. Racing Hall of Fame trainer Preston M. Burch while he was in charge of William du Pont, Jr.'s Foxcatcher Farm racing stable in the early 1930s. Handlen took over the Foxcatcher stable and began winning important races by 1935. He would remain in that position through 1960.

In 1937, Richard Handlen became the only trainer in history to win the two most prestigious races in California at Santa Anita Park when he won the Santa Anita Derby with Fairy Hill and the Santa Anita Handicap with  Rosemont. Through 2009, his record remains intact.
 The following year, Richard Handlen trained Dauber to a victory in the 1938 Preakness Stakes after finishing second in the Kentucky Derby. Dauber then went on to run second to Pasteurized in the Belmont Stakes.

Richard Handlen was inducted into the Delaware Park Wall of Fame in 2016.

Champions
Richard Handlen conditioned Foxcatcher Farm horses to six American championships:
 Fairy Chant - 1940 American Champion Three-Year-Old Filly (1940) and 1941 American Champion Older Female Horse
 Parlo - 1954 American Champion Three-Year-Old Filly and the 1954 and 1955 American Champion Older Female Horse.
 Berlo - 1960 American Champion Three-Year-Old Filly.

Wartime military service
Richard Handlen's military tombstone states that he served with the United States military in World War I as part of the Farrier Medical Department.

Richard Handlen was living in Florida at the time of his death in 1963.

References

1897 births
1963 deaths
American horse trainers
American military personnel of World War I